Romy Saalfeld (born 14 December 1960, in Weißenfels) is a German rower.

References 
 
 

1960 births
Living people
East German female rowers
People from Weißenfels
Rowers at the 1980 Summer Olympics
Olympic gold medalists for East Germany
Olympic rowers of East Germany
Olympic medalists in rowing
World Rowing Championships medalists for East Germany
Medalists at the 1980 Summer Olympics
Sportspeople from Saxony-Anhalt